William H. Nicklas (1866–1960) was an Ohio architect who was best known for his church designs in partnership with Sidney Badgley.

Nicklas was born in New Philadelphia, Ohio and graduated from Ohio Northern University. He first began his career in education and was working as an architect by 1894 in New Philadelphia. He moved to Cleveland, Ohio in 1897 and worked in Sidney Rose Badgley's office as a draftsman. Nicklas became a partner in 1904 in the firm which became known as Badgley and Nicklas until it was dissolved in 1913.  Nicklas continued the firm for several years after the death of Badgley in 1917.

The largest portion of the firm's work was in the Cleveland area but also designed buildings throughout the Midwestern United States. Many of these buildings are today listed on the National Register of Historic Places.

Incomplete list of extant Nicklas designs:

Selected works 

 Lakewood United Methodist Church, Cleveland, Ohio, 1904
 Cleveland Heights Presbyterian Church, Cleveland, Ohio, 1904
 Central Methodist (United) Church, Calgary, Alberta, 1905
 St. John AME Church, Cleveland, Ohio, 1908
 Grace Methodist Church, Zanesville, Ohio, 1909
 Fourth Reformed Church, Cleveland, Ohio, 1909
 Trinity United Methodist Church, Athens, Tennessee 1910
 Fidelity Baptist Church, Cleveland, OH, 1911
 First Presbyterian Church, Wichita, Kansas, 1912
 Lakewood Congregational Church, Lakewood, Ohio, 1913
 Broadway Methodist Church, Cleveland, Ohio, 1918–19
 Third Christian Church, Norfolk, Virginia, 1922
 Trinity Episcopal Church, New Philadelphia, Ohio
 Trinity United Methodist Church, Sandusky, Ohio, 1923

References 

Ohio Northern University alumni
1866 births
1960 deaths
Architects from Cleveland